Scholanda Michelle (Robinson) Davis (born January 9, 1983) is an American professional women's basketball player in the WNBA, most recently with the Tulsa Shock.

Davis was born in Miami, Florida and attended Miami Edison High School before attending Louisiana State University. She graduated in 2006 and was selected 14th overall in the 2006 WNBA Draft by the Sacramento Monarchs.

LSU statistics
Source

References

External links
WNBA Player Profile

1983 births
Living people
American women's basketball players
Basketball players from Miami
LSU Lady Tigers basketball players
Sacramento Monarchs players
San Antonio Stars players
Shooting guards
Tulsa Shock players